The red river hog (Potamochoerus porcus) or bushpig (a name also used for the Potamochoerus larvatus), is a wild member of the pig family living in Africa, with most of its distribution in the Guinean and Congolian forests. It is rarely seen away from rainforests, and generally prefers areas near rivers or swamps.

Description

 
The red river hog has striking orange to reddish-brown fur, with black legs and a tufted white stripe along the spine. Adults have white markings around the eyes and on the cheeks and jaws; the rest of the muzzle and face are a contrasting black. The fur on the jaw and the flanks is longer than that on the body, with the males having especially prominent facial whiskers. Unlike other species of pig native to tropical Africa, the entire body is covered in hair, with no bare skin visible.

The ears are also long and thin, ending in tufts of white or black hair that may each  in length. Boars are somewhat larger than sows, and have distinct conical protuberances on either side of the snout and rather small, sharp tusks. The facial protuberances are bony and probably protect the boar's facial tendons during head-to-head combat with other males.

Both sexes have scent glands close to the eyes and on the feet; males have additional glands near the tusks on the upper jaw and on the penis. Females have six teats.

Distribution and habitat
The red river hog lives in rainforests, wet dense savannas, and forested valleys, and near rivers, lakes and marshes.  The species' distribution ranges from the Congo area and Gambia to the eastern Congo, southwards to the Kasai and the Congo River.  The exact delineation of its range versus that of the bushpig is unclear; but in broad terms, the red river hog occupies western and central Africa, and the bushpig occupies eastern and southern Africa. Where the two meet, they are sometimes said to interbreed, although other authorities dispute this. Although numerous subspecies have been identified in the past, none are currently recognised.

Behaviour

Red river hogs are often active during the day, but are primarily nocturnal or crepuscular. They typically live in small groups of approximately six to ten animals, composed of a single adult male, and a number of adult females and their young. However, much larger groups, some with over 30 individuals, have been noted in particularly favourable habitats. The boar defends his harem aggressively against predators, with leopards being a particularly common threat.

They communicate almost continuously with grunts and squeals with a repertoire that can signal alarm, distress, or passive contact.

The species is omnivorous, eating mainly roots and tubers, and supplements its diet with fruit, grasses, herbs, eggs, dead animal and plant remains, insects, and lizards. It uses its large muzzle to snuffle about in the soil in search of food, as well as scraping the ground with their tusks and fore-feet. They can cause damage to agricultural crops, such as cassava and yams.

Reproduction

Red river hogs breed seasonally, so that the young are born between the end of the dry season in February and the midpoint of the rainy season in July. The oestrus cycle lasts 34 to 37 days. The male licks the female's genital region before mating, which lasts about five to ten minutes. Gestation lasts 120 days.

The mother constructs a nest from dead leaves and dry grass before giving birth to a litter of up to six piglets, with three to four being most common. The piglets weigh  at birth, and are initially dark brown with yellowish stripes and spots. They are weaned after about four months, and develop the plain reddish adult coat by about six months; the dark facial markings do not appear until they reach adulthood at about two years of age. They probably live for about fifteen years in the wild.

References

Red river hog
Mammals of Cameroon
Mammals of the Central African Republic
Mammals of Chad
Mammals of the Democratic Republic of the Congo
Mammals of Equatorial Guinea
Mammals of Gabon
Mammals of the Republic of the Congo
Mammals of Central Africa
Mammals of West Africa
Red river hog
Red river hog